National Route 399 is a national highway of Japan connecting Iwaki, Fukushima and Nan'yō, Yamagata in Japan, with a total length of .

See also

References

National highways in Japan
Roads in Fukushima Prefecture
Roads in Miyagi Prefecture
Roads in Yamagata Prefecture